Napak District is a district in Northern Uganda. It is named after Mount Napak, and its headquarters is at Lokitede.

Location
Napak District is located in the Karamoja sub-region, Northeastern Uganda. It is bordered by Abim District to the northwest, Kotido District to the north, Moroto District to the northeast and east, Nakapiripirit District to the southeast, Katakwi District to the south, Amuria District to the southwest and Otuke District to the west. The district coordinates are:02 12N, 34 18E.

Overview
Napak District was carved out of Moroto District in 2010. The district is administered by Napak District Administration, with Napak, as the district headquarters. Napak District is part of the Karamoja sub-region. 
Karamoja includes the following districts: 1. Abim District 2. Amudat District 3. Kaabong District 4. Kotido District 5. Moroto District 6. Nakapiripirit District 7. Napak District. According to the national census of 2002, the sub-reguion was home to an estimated 800,000 people at that time.

Population
The 1991 national population census estimated the district population at about 37,700. In 2002, the national census that year, estimated the population of the district at 112,700. In 2012, the district population was estimated at about 197,700. In 2012, the population of Napak District was estimated at approximately 197,700.

See also
 Napak
 Karamoja sub-region
 Northern Region, Uganda
 Districts of Uganda

References

External links
  Napak District Information Portal

 
Districts of Uganda
Northern Region, Uganda
Karamoja